Pavel Igorevich Drozd (born 14 December 1995) is a Russian ice dancer who currently competes with Elizaveta Shanaeva. With his former skating partner, Alla Loboda, he is a two-time World Junior medalist (silver in 2017, bronze in 2016), a three-time JGP Final silver medalist (2014–15, 2015–16, 2016–17), and the 2016 Russian junior national champion. With his former skating partner, Ksenia Konkina, he is the 2019 CS Asian Open Trophy and 2019 CS Warsaw Cup silver medalist.

Personal life 
Pavel Igorevich Drozd was born on 14 December 1995 in Saint Petersburg, Russia. He moved to Moscow in 2010. His younger sister, Daria, has also competed in ice dancing. He studies foreign languages, first English and Spanish, and has now also taken up Italian and French.

Career

Early years 
Drozd began learning to skate at age five in Saint Petersburg. He had an ice dancing partnership with Anastasia Safronova from 2008 to 2010. After they parted ways, Ksenia Rumiantseva invited him to join her group in Moscow. He then competed with Valeria Podlazova for two seasons.

Start of partnership with Loboda 
On 10 March 2012, Drozd began skating with Alla Loboda, who trained under the same coaches. Led by Ksenia Rumiantseva and Ekaterina Volobueva in Moscow, they placed 11th at the 2013 Russian Junior Championships.

2013–2014 season 
Loboda/Drozd debuted on the ISU Junior Grand Prix (JGP) series in the 2013–14 season, obtaining bronze medals in Riga, Latvia and Gdańsk, Poland. They finished fifth at the 2014 Russian Junior Championships.

2014–2015 season 
Loboda/Drozd's first assignment of the 2014–15 JGP season was in Courchevel, France. Ranked second in the short dance and first in the free dance, they won the gold medal by a margin of 2.82 points over Canada's Madeline Edwards / Zhao Kai Pang. They took silver in Aichi, Japan, finishing second to Edwards/Pang by 0.44 points. Loboda/Drozd qualified for the JGP Final in Barcelona, where they won the silver medal behind teammates Anna Yanovskaya / Sergei Mozgov. Having finished 4th at the 2015 Russian Junior Championships, they were not named in Russia's team to the 2015 World Junior Championships.

2015–2016 season 
In the 2015–16 JGP season, Loboda/Drozd won the silver medal in Bratislava, Slovakia, and then gold in Linz, Austria, before taking silver behind Americans Lorraine McNamara / Quinn Carpenter at the 2015–16 JGP Final in Barcelona. After winning their first junior national title, they were awarded the bronze medal at the 2016 World Junior Championships in Debrecen, Hungary, having finished third behind McNamara/Carpenter and Rachel Parsons / Michael Parsons.

2016–2017 season 
Competing in the 2016–17 JGP season, Loboda/Drozd won gold medals in Saransk, Russia, and Tallinn, Estonia. In December 2016, they were awarded the silver medal behind the Parsons at the 2016–17 JGP Final in Marseille, France.

In March 2017 they won the silver medal at the 2017 World Junior Championships.

2017–2018 season 
Loboda/Drozd started their senior career by winning the silver medal at the 2017 CS Lombardia Trophy. In October 2017, they made their Grand Prix debut at the 2017 Skate Canada, where they placed 5th. Next month they competed at their 2nd GP event of the season, the 2017 Internationaux de France, where they placed 9th. In December 2017, they competed at the 2018 Russian Championships, where they placed 6th after placing 6th in both the short dance and the free dance.

Anjelika Krylova and Oleg Volkov became their new coaches in May 2018. Loboda and Drozd ended their partnership by July.

2018–2019 season 
In July 2018, Alexander Zhulin began coaching the partnership of Drozd and Angélique Abachkina, but the skaters parted ways after learning that the French federation would not release her to compete for Russia. On 5 November 2018, Drozd confirmed that he had teamed up with Ksenia Konkina and would continue to be coached by Zhulin. Konkina/Drozd made their international debut at the 2019 Open Ice Mall Cup where they won the bronze medal.

2019–2020 season 
Konkina/Drozd opened their season by winning the gold medal at 2019 NRW Trophy in Dortmund, Germany. They then won silver at the 2019 CS Asian Open Trophy behind Christina Carreira / Anthony Ponomarenko of the United States.

2020–2021 season 
Konkina/Drozd were scheduled to make their Grand Prix debut at the 2020 Rostelecom Cup but withdrew. The team split later in the season after health issues forced Konkina to retire. Drozd re-teamed with Angélique Abachkina after she successfully obtained her release from the Fédération Française des Sports de Glace.

Programs

With Shanaeva

with Abachkina

With Konkina

With Loboda

Records and achievements
(with Loboda)

 Set the junior-level ice dance record for the combined total score to 164.37 points at the 2017 World Junior Championships.

Competitive highlights 
GP: Grand Prix; CS: Challenger Series; JGP: Junior Grand Prix

With Shanaeva

With Abachkina

With Konkina

With Loboda

Detailed results 
Small medals for short and free programs awarded only at ISU Championships.

With Konkina

With Loboda

References

External links 

 
 

1995 births
Russian male ice dancers
World Junior Figure Skating Championships medalists
Living people
Figure skaters from Saint Petersburg